Rostashevka is a rural locality (a selo) in Rostashevskoye Rural Settlement, Paninsky District, Voronezh Oblast, Russia. The population was 53 as of 2010. There are 2 streets.

Geography 
Rostashevka is located 13 km southwest of Panino (the district's administrative centre) by road. Mirovka is the nearest rural locality.

References 

Rural localities in Paninsky District